Daniel McDonald (October 9, 1908 – October 10, 1979) was a Canadian wrestler. He was born in Toronto. He was Olympic silver medalist in freestyle wrestling in 1932, and also competed at the 1928 Olympics.

References

External links

1908 births
1979 deaths
Sportspeople from Toronto
Olympic wrestlers of Canada
Wrestlers at the 1928 Summer Olympics
Wrestlers at the 1932 Summer Olympics
Canadian male sport wrestlers
Olympic silver medalists for Canada
Olympic medalists in wrestling
Medalists at the 1932 Summer Olympics
20th-century Canadian people